Shenandoah University is a private university in Winchester, Virginia. It has an enrollment of approximately 4,000 students across more than 200 areas of study in six schools: College of Arts & Sciences (including the Division of Education and Leadership and the Division of Applied Technology), School of Business, Shenandoah Conservatory, Bernard J. Dunn School of Pharmacy, Eleanor Wade Custer School of Nursing, and the School of Health Professions (Athletic Training, Occupational Therapy, Physician Assistant Studies and Physical Therapy). Shenandoah University is one of five United Methodist Church-affiliated institutions of higher education in the Commonwealth of Virginia.

History
Rev. Abram Paul Funkhouser and Rev. John (Jay) Paul Fries founded the school as Shenandoah Seminary in 1875. At the time, it was located on a 10-acre campus in Dayton, Virginia, and classes were initially held in a two-room lo structure. The school had 11 students enrolled in its first year.

Shenandoah Seminary became a junior college in 1924, changing its name to Shenandoah College the following year. Shenandoah Conservatory became a separate corporation in 1937 and began granting four-year degrees. 

In 1960, Shenandoah College and the Shenandoah Conservatory moved to the 126-acre Winchester campus and began offering four-year degrees in 1974 (at which time the college and conservatory corporations were merged). It sold its Dayton campus for $107,875.

Shenandoah obtained university status on January 1, 1991, and today the student body represents 47 states plus the District of Columbia. The university, as of fall 2021, has 252 full-time and 202 part-time faculty members. The student body represents 48 foreign countries. Over 70 percent of full-time faculty have an earned doctorate (Ph.D. or similar) in their fields or other terminal degree.

Name
According to the university's official history page, the name Shenandoah is derived from the Native American legend of Zynodoa, a brave warrior whose life of strength and courage and his appreciation of beauty resulted in having a river and a valley named for him. Popular myth further ascribes translation of the word "Shenandoah" to mean "daughter of the stars."

Locations

The university operates in six locations:
 Winchester
 Downtown Winchester
 Health Professions Building on the campus of Winchester Medical Center
 Shenandoah River Campus at Cool Spring Battlefield
 Scholar Plaza, Loudoun
 Inova Center for Personalized Health, Fairfax

The main location of campus is in Winchester near Interstate 81, and the Health Professions Building is located near the Winchester Medical Center. The Scholar Plaza, Loudoun, site in Ashburn, Virginia, is home to graduate programs in business, education, leadership studies, occupational therapy, physical therapy, and physician assistant studies, as well as the accelerated-second-degree Bachelor of Science in Nursing program. Shenandoah's educational site at the Inova Center for Personalized Health in Fairfax, Virginia, is the location for doctoral-level programs in pharmacy. ICPH, Fairfax, is also where the university offers graduate programs and postgraduate certificates in nursing and supports an online master's degree in public health. There are also a number of satellite offices and facilities located throughout Winchester.

In 2013, Shenandoah University accepted stewardship of 195 acres of land along the Shenandoah River, now known as the Shenandoah River Campus at Cool Spring Battlefield. Purchased by the Civil War Trust in 2012, stewardship of the property transferred to the university in spring 2013 to protect and preserve the former battlefield site. The property now serves as an outdoor classroom and living laboratory for the university community and the general public.

Academics

Shenandoah offers more than 200 areas of study at the bachelor's, master's, and doctoral-degree levels, as well as through undergraduate and graduate certificates, across six schools. Its programming includes Virginia's first bachelor's degrees in virtual reality design and esports management, as well as the state's oldest music therapy program (offered at the undergraduate and graduate levels).

College of Arts & Sciences
School of Business
Shenandoah Conservatory
Bernard J. Dunn School of Pharmacy
Eleanor Wade Custer School of Nursing
School of Health Professions

Shenandoah University no longer offers a tenure track for new faculty members. Instead, new faculty members undergo a 5-year probationary period, after which they are eligible for 3-year, renewable "career faculty contracts."

Athletics

The Shenandoah athletic teams are called the Hornets. The university is a member of the Division III of the National Collegiate Athletic Association (NCAA), primarily competing in the Old Dominion Athletic Conference (ODAC) since the 2012–13 academic year. The Hornets previously competed in the USA South Athletic Conference (USA South) from 1992–93 to 2011–12.

Shenandoah competes in 22 intercollegiate varsity sports: Men's sports include baseball, basketball, cross country, football, golf, lacrosse, soccer, tennis, track & field (indoor and outdoor) and wrestling; while women's sports include basketball, cross country, field hockey, golf, lacrosse, soccer, softball, tennis, track & field (indoor and outdoor) and volleyball.

The university announced the creation of a Marching Band in June 2021, which debuted during the Fall 2022 semester.

Partnership relations

Shenandoah University has agreements with many international colleges and universities, and also participates in the British Council's Business Education Initiative and Irish-American Scholars program in conjunction with universities and colleges in Northern Ireland, United Kingdom.

Notable alumni
 Kate Flannery, actress, played Meredith Palmer (2005–2013) in the television comedy The Office
 Harold Perrineau, actor, played Link in The Matrix Reloaded and The Matrix Revolutions
 Carter Beauford, American drummer, percussionist, and founding member of Dave Matthews Band
 Tiffany Lawrence, a former Democratic member of the West Virginia House of Delegates, representing the 65th district.
 Wendy Gooditis, an American real estate agent, educator, and Democratic politician.
 Carl Tanner, an American operatic tenor
 Richard Zarou, a contemporary composer of concert and film music and the host of the new music podcast No Extra Notes
 Mac Wiseman, Bluegrass music legend

References

External links
 Official website
 Official athletics website

 
Educational institutions established in 1875
Music schools in Virginia
Universities and colleges accredited by the Southern Association of Colleges and Schools
Private universities and colleges in Virginia
Education in Winchester, Virginia
Buildings and structures in Winchester, Virginia
1875 establishments in Virginia